Gjersjøen is a lake in the municipalities Oppegård and Ås in Akershus county, Norway. The lake drains through Gjersjøelva to Bunnefjorden.

References

Oppegård
Lakes of Viken (county)